Cytochrome c oxidase subunit 6A1, mitochondrial is a protein that in humans is encoded by the COX6A1 gene. Cytochrome c oxidase 6A1 is a subunit of the cytochrome c oxidase complex, also known as Complex IV, the last enzyme in the mitochondrial electron transport chain. A mutation of the COX6A1 gene is associated with a recessive axonal or mixed form of Charcot-Marie-Tooth disease.

Structure 
The COX6A1 gene, located on the q arm of chromosome 12 in position 24.2, contains 3 exons and is 2,653 base pairs in length. The COX6A1 protein weighs 12 kDa and is composed of 109 amino acids. The protein is a subunit of Complex IV, a heteromeric complex consisting of 3 catalytic subunits encoded by mitochondrial genes and multiple structural subunits encoded by nuclear genes. This nuclear gene encodes polypeptide 1 (liver isoform) of subunit VIa, and polypeptide 1 is found in all non-muscle tissues. Polypeptide 2 (heart/muscle isoform) of subunit VIa is encoded by a different gene, COX6A2, and is present only in striated muscles. These two polypeptides share 66% amino acid sequence identity.

Function 

Cytochrome c oxidase (COX) is the terminal enzyme of the mitochondrial respiratory chain. It is a multi-subunit enzyme complex that couples the transfer of electrons from cytochrome c to molecular oxygen and contributes to a proton electrochemical gradient across the inner mitochondrial membrane to drive ATP synthesis via protonmotive force.  The mitochondrially-encoded subunits perform the electron transfer of proton pumping activities. The functions of the nuclear-encoded subunits are unknown but they may play a role in the regulation and assembly of the complex.

Summary reaction:
 4 Fe2+-cytochrome c + 8 H+in + O2 → 4 Fe3+-cytochrome c + 2 H2O + 4 H+out

Clinical significance 

A mutation leading to a 5 base pair deletion in the COX6A1 gene is associated with Charcot-Marie-Tooth disease (CMT). CMT is the most common inherited neuropathy and can result from mutations in over 30 different loci. Expression of COX6A1 is significantly reduced in affected individuals.

The Trans-activator of transcription protein (Tat) of human immunodeficiency virus (HIV) inhibits cytochrome c oxidase (COX) activity in permeabilized mitochondria isolated from both mouse and human liver, heart, and brain samples. Rapid loss of membrane potential (ΔΨm) occurs with submicromolar doses of Tat, and cytochrome c is released from the mitochondria.

References

Further reading

External links 
Mass spectrometry characterization of COX6A1 at COPaKB
 
 

Genes
Human proteins